The Reluctant Widow is a 1946 Regency romance novel by Georgette Heyer which describes the story of the heroine Elinor Rochdale who has her life turned upside down when she enters the wrong carriage on her way to be a governess to sustain herself. The story is set in early 1813. It was adapted into a film in 1950.

Plot summary
The heroine, Elinor Rochdale, daughter of a ruined gentleman, has been working as a governess to sustain herself. Stepping into the wrong carriage at a Sussex village, en route to a new governess position, Elinor finds herself in the wrong house, required by the sensible, sophisticated Edward Carlyon to marry his profligate cousin, Eustace Cheviot. In a somewhat dazed state, Elinor soon finds herself coerced into becoming the wife of a dying man, the mistress of a ruined estate and a partner in a secret conspiracy to save the family's name in only one night.

Following Eustace's death, a sub-plot surrounding Cheviot and information supplied to the French – with whom the country is at war – comes to light and results in some spirited battles between Elinor and Carlyon. Ultimately, the incriminating information is taken back into safe hands and Elinor and Carlyon fall in love.

Characters
Miss Elinor Rochdale – the heroine, 26

Edward 'Ned', Lord Carlyon 		

Eustace Cheviot – master of Highnoons, cousin of Lord Carlyon

John Carlyon  – a diplomat, younger brother of Lord Carlyon	

Mr and Mrs Barrow – retainers at Highnoons

Nicky Carlyon – youngest brother of Edward, rusticated from Oxford	University

Bouncer – Nicky's dog	

Lord Bedlington – uncle of Eustace Cheviot	

Francis Cheviot – son of Lord Bedlington	

Louis de Castres – son of a French emigré

Film adaptation

The novel was adapted into a comedy released in April 1950 directed by Bernard Knowles.

References

External links
 The Reluctant Widow at IMDB

1946 British novels
Novels by Georgette Heyer
Historical novels
Fiction set in 1813
Novels set in Sussex
Heinemann (publisher) books
British novels adapted into films
Regency romance novels